Dead on the Track is a 1943 detective novel by John Rhode, the pen name of the British writer Cecil Street. It is the thirty seventh in his long-running series of novels featuring Lancelot Priestley, a Golden Age armchair detective. Like a number of mystery novels of the era, it has a railway setting. In theme and plot it is very similar to the author's earlier 1931 work Tragedy on the Line. It is the first entry in the series since Hendon's First Case (1935) in which Priestley's old associate Hanslet is the lead investigator. The other recurring police officer in the series Inspector Jimmy Waghorn is now working with military intelligence.

Synopsis
Near the small settlement of Filmerham, the stationmaster discovers a body lying close to the tracks not far from the station. Due to a wartime shortage of police personnel, the retired Superintendent Hanslet is called back into action. By recalling an earlier deduction made by Priestley in a similar case, he is able to work towards a solution.

References

Bibliography
 Evans, Curtis. Masters of the "Humdrum" Mystery: Cecil John Charles Street, Freeman Wills Crofts, Alfred Walter Stewart and the British Detective Novel, 1920-1961. McFarland, 2014.
 Magill, Frank Northen . Critical Survey of Mystery and Detective Fiction: Authors, Volume 3. Salem Press, 1988.
 Reilly, John M. Twentieth Century Crime & Mystery Writers. Springer, 2015.

1943 British novels
Novels by Cecil Street
British crime novels
British mystery novels
British detective novels
Collins Crime Club books
Novels set in London